The 1974 Pennsylvania gubernatorial election was held on November 5. Incumbent Democratic Governor Milton Shapp defeated Republican Drew Lewis. Under the state's 1968 constitution, Shapp was the first governor who was eligible to run for consecutive terms.

Primary elections
Incumbent Governor Shapp easily dispelled a spirited challenge from Martin Mullen, a state representative from Philadelphia who was well known as a firebrand conservative opponent of abortion and pornography. With a short Republican bench, wealthy staffing executive Drew Lewis was the only serious contender in the race.

Major Party Candidates

Democratic
Milton Shapp, incumbent Governor
running mate: Ernie Kline, incumbent Lieutenant Governor

Republican
Drew Lewis, CEO of the staffing company Snelling & Snelling
running mate: Ken Lee, Speaker of the State House of Representatives

Campaign
Shapp's popularity had waned somewhat since his comfortable victory in 1970; although he could claim to have saved the state from bankruptcy, he did so at the expense of large tax increases. Furthermore, Shapp, an unabashed liberal, had difficulty rekindling support from the state's rural, socially conservative regions. However, Shapp and Democrats as a whole received a significant boost from the Watergate scandal; with President Richard Nixon's popularity in a tailspin, many of the top tier Republicans declined to run. Instead, the party turned to the wealthy businessman Lewis, who was able to project an "outsider" image. Lewis focused on local issues and greatly undercut Shapp in rural areas; despite lagging at the polls in traditional Democratic strongholds such as Pittsburgh and Scranton, Shapp preserved a moderate victory by winning the combined vote of suburban Philadelphia, an unexpected accomplishment for a Democrat at the time.

Results

Notes

a.  Scherr, at the time, was only 21 years old and, therefore, ineligible to be governor.

References

Sources

 

1974
Gubernatorial
Pennsylvania
November 1974 events in the United States